Dora (Dura) International Stadium is an association football stadium in the city of Dura in the Hebron Governorate district of the West Bank. It was opened in 1965  and was renovated in 1999 and 2011. It has a capacity of 18,000 and the surface is artificial turf. Renovations cost more than US$7 million.

In February 2018 the stadium was named after Houari Boumédiène, the second president of Algeria and a supporter of Palestinian President Yasser Arafat.

In November 2019 the world's largest keffiyeh, measuring 3,000 square meters was unveiled at the stadium in honor of the late President Arafat.

References

External links
Dora International Stadium, soccerway.com

Football venues in the State of Palestine
Buildings and structures in the West Bank
Sport in the West Bank